Kaip Khan was a Khan of Khiva (appears to be second Kaip Khan in the line). They were rivals of the Uzbek leader Abulkhair.

See also
Khiva
Ayaguz River

References

History of Uzbekistan
Khanates
Mongol dynasties